Stefan Siczek (September 20, 1937 – July 31, 2012) was a Polish prelate of the Roman Catholic Church.

Stefan Siczek was born in Siczki and ordained a priest on May 27, 1961. Siczek was appointed auxiliary bishop of the Diocese of Radom as well as titular bishop of Dagnum on March 25, 1992 and ordained bishop on April 11, 1992. Siczek died in Radom aged 74.

See also
Diocese of Radom

External links
Catholic-Hierarchy

20th-century Roman Catholic bishops in Poland
21st-century Roman Catholic bishops in Poland
Polish Roman Catholic titular bishops
1937 births
2012 deaths